Coleburns Gully is a river of Jamaica.

See also
List of rivers of Jamaica

References
 GEOnet Names Server 
OMC Map
CIA Map
Ford, Jos C. and Finlay, A.A.C. (1908).The Handbook of Jamaica. Jamaica Government Printing Office

Rivers of Jamaica